The Congo national under-20 football team is the under-20 football (soccer) team of the Republic of the Congo. They were eliminated by South Africa in the first round of the 2013 African Youth Championship qualifiers. They also qualified, but failed to get past the group stage, in the 2015 African U-20 Championship hosted in Senegal.

Competition records

 Champions   Runners-up   Third place   Fourth place

Red border color indicates tournament was held on home soil.

FIFA U-20 World Cup record

Africa U-20 Cup of Nations record

A gold background colour indicates that Congo won the tournament.

*Draws include knockout matches decided on penalty kicks.

Congo national football team